Amman Rotana Hotel is a hotel in New Abdali in the district of Al-Abdali, Amman, Jordan. It is managed by Rotana Hotels. At 188 metres tall, it is ranked first on the list of tallest buildings in Amman.

References

External links

 

Hotel buildings completed in 2016
Hotels established in 2016
Hotels in Amman
Rotana Hotel Management Corporation PJSC
Skyscraper hotels
Skyscrapers in Amman
Tourist attractions in Amman